Emrullah Güvenç (born 27 January 1987) is a former professional footballer. He has represented Turkey at under-19 level. His older brother Serdal Güvenç is also a professional football player.

Career
Güvenç made his debut in the Dutch Eerste Divisie (D2) with Fortuna Sittard in 2004. Since then, he played over 170 games and scored more than 40 times. Because of his strong performance during the first period of season 2012–13 season, in which he scored 9 goals in 10 appearances, Güvenç was given the nickname "Superturk" by the Belgian press.

After having played for Sporting Hasselt for one season, Güvenç joined amateur club FC Anadol in June 2018.

Personal life
After his professional career, Güvenç began owning a restaurant in his hometown Genk together with his wife, Tuba Gedik.

References

External links
 

1987 births
Living people
Turkish footballers
Turkey youth international footballers
Belgian footballers
Belgian people of Turkish descent
Fortuna Sittard players
TOP Oss players
Helmond Sport players
Kartalspor footballers
Royal Antwerp F.C. players
MVV Maastricht players
Eerste Divisie players
Challenger Pro League players
Association football midfielders
Sporting Hasselt players
Sportspeople from Genk
Footballers from Limburg (Belgium)
Turkish expatriate footballers
Belgian expatriate footballers
Expatriate footballers in the Netherlands
Turkish expatriate sportspeople in the Netherlands
Belgian expatriate sportspeople in the Netherlands